Ruby Cruz is an American actress. She has acted in various short movies and TV series including Mare of Easttown, The Jump, Spin, Aging Out, and most notably the Willow Disney+ series which premiered in the fall of 2022. 

In 2023 she made her feature length movie debut in Bottoms from director Emma Seligman.

Career

In 2018 Cruz played the younger version of Annie Wilkes, played by Lizzy Caplan, in Castle Rock (TV series). Cruz received praise from TVLine for the way she captured the physicality of the Caplan performance. In 2020 Cruz appeared in season
10 of Blue Bloods. 

In early 2021 Ruby Cruz appeared as Jess Riley in the HBO drama series Mare of Easttown.

This was followed by Cruz's announcement in March 2021 as being cast as princess Kit Tanthalos in the first season of the Disney+ series Willow - which premiered in November 2022. The Willow series acts as a direct sequel to the 1988 film of the same title. Though Kit has been Ruby's most notable role to date, she has since followed with her feature film debut as Hazel in Bottoms (2023).

Filmography

Television

Movies

References

Further reading
'Willow' stars Ruby Cruz and Erin Kellyman break down that epic love scene
‘Willow’ Star Ruby Cruz Talks Her Complicated Disney Princess and Taking Over the Role From Her Good Friend
 Ruby Cruz Says Playing Princess Kit in Willow Was 'Empowering' And 'Therapeutic' | Exclusive
'Willow': Ruby Cruz on How She Carved Her Own Unique Path to Becoming a Disney Series Star
‘Willow’: Ruby Cruz Cast As A Lead In Disney+ Series

External links
 

21st-century American actresses
Living people
Actresses from Los Angeles
American television actresses
Year of birth missing (living people)